The Turkmen Democratic Movement is a political party in Iraq that is headed by Kalkhi Najmaddin Noureddin. It acts as an alternative to the more heavily funded Iraqi Turkmen Front. The party was created by ex-Front members in 2004, who believed the interference of Turkey in its affairs was not helping the Iraqi Turkmen community and that Turkmens would do better to co-operate with the Kurdistan Region. It supports the annexation of Kirkuk to the Kurdistan Region, and is supportive of the Kurdistan Regional Government. The party won 3 seats in the Kurdistan National Assembly at the 2009 election, making them the leading Turkmen political force in that body. The party sought to obtain a ministerial portfolio following those elections.

At the 2013 elections, the party lost all three of its seats to the Turkmen Development List and Turkmen Change and Renewal, while the Erbil Turkmen List and Iraqi Turkmen Front held on to one seat each.

References

Political parties in Kurdistan Region
Turkmen political parties in Iraq